Ariana Ince (born March 14, 1989) is an American track and field athlete specializing in the javelin throw. She represented her country at the 2017 and 2019 World Championships without qualifying for the final. In addition, she won a bronze medal at the 2019 Pan American Games.

Her personal best in the event is 64.38 metres set in Zagreb in 2022.

She qualified to represent the United States at the 2020 Summer Olympics.

International competitions

References

External links 
 
 
 
 
 

1989 births
Living people
Track and field athletes from San Antonio
American female javelin throwers
World Athletics Championships athletes for the United States
Pan American Games bronze medalists for the United States
Athletes (track and field) at the 2019 Pan American Games
Rice Owls women's track and field athletes
USA Outdoor Track and Field Championships winners
Pan American Games medalists in athletics (track and field)
Medalists at the 2019 Pan American Games
Olympic track and field athletes of the United States
Athletes (track and field) at the 2020 Summer Olympics
Olympic female javelin throwers